Corny Collins (born 1933) is a former German stage, film and television actress. She was married to the actor Christian Wolff.

Selected filmography
 Voyage to Italy, Complete with Love (1958)
 Father, Mother and Nine Children (1958)
 My Ninety Nine Brides (1958)
 The Muzzle (1958)
 Immer die Radfahrer (1958)
 I Was All His (1958)
 Heart Without Mercy (1958)
 Freddy, the Guitar and the Sea (1959)
  (1959)
 Crime After School (1959)
 The Day the Rains Came (1959)
 Until Money Departs You (1960)
 The Post Has Gone (1962)
 Wild Water (1962)
 The Indian Scarf (1963)
 ...denn die Musik und die Liebe in Tirol (1963)
 If You Go Swimming in Tenerife (1964)
 High Season for Spies (1966)
 Hotel by the Hour (1970)
 The Priest of St. Pauli (1970)

References

Bibliography
 Bergfelder, Tim. International Adventures: German Popular Cinema and European Co-productions in the 1960s. Berghahn Books, 2005.

External links

1933 births
Living people
German film actresses
German stage actresses
20th-century German actresses
Actresses from Berlin